Gravitcornutia latiloba is a species of moth of the family Tortricidae. It is found in Mato Grosso, Brazil.

The wingspan is 10 mm. The ground colour of the forewings is white with blackish marginal dots. The hindwings are pale brownish grey, but whiter basally.

Etymology
The species name refers to the lobes of the sterigma and is derived from Latin latus (meaning broad).

References

Moths described in 2010
Gravitcornutia
Moths of South America
Taxa named by Józef Razowski